Zambia Industrial Commercial Bank (ZICB), is a commercial bank in Zambia. The bank is one of the commercial banks licensed by the Bank of Zambia, the central bank and national banking regulator.

History
In November 2016, the Bank of Zambia took possession of the Intermarket Banking Corporation Zambia Limited, a commercial bank, which had become insolvent and unable to meet its financial obligations. In February 2017, the central bank announced that it would re-structure Intermarket Bank, to enable it to re-open.

Subsequently, agreement was reached with the shareholders of the collapsed bank, on how the bank could be re-opened. The National Pension Scheme Authority (NAPSA), a depositor in the collapsed bank opted to convert its ZMW50 million (approximately US$3.5 million) into equity in the restructured institution.

The restructured bank opened for business on 23 October 2018, in Lusaka, Zambia's capital city, with new shareholders and under new management, in a ceremony presided over by the then Minister of Finance, Margaret Mwanakatwe. The restructured bank was named Zambia Industrial Commercial Bank.

Ownership
, the bank's stock was owned by the following corporate entities:

Branch network
As of November 2019, the bank maintained a network of branches in the cities of Lusaka, the capital and Kitwe, in the Copperbelt Province.

Governance
The chairman of the seven-person board of directors is Charles Sichangwa. The managing director is Ignatius Mwanza.

See also
 Intermarket Bank
 List of banks in Zambia
 Economy of Zambia

References

External links
 Website of Bank of Zambia
 Website of Zambia Industrial Commercial Bank
 ZICB Officially Launched

Banks of Zambia
Companies based in Lusaka
Banks established in 2018
2018 establishments in Zambia